Sir Kenneth William Blackburne  (12 December 1907 – 4 November 1980) was a British colonial official who was the first governor-general of Jamaica. He was knighted in 1952.

Early life
Blackburne was born on 12 December 1907 in Bordon Camp, Bordon, Hampshire, England, the first son of The Very Reverend Harry Blackburne. He attended Marlborough College and graduated from Clare College at the University of Cambridge with a degree in Modern Languages and Geography.

Career
Blackburne entered the colonial service in 1930 and served in Nigeria, Palestine and the Gambia. He then served in the West Indies from 1943 to 1947 and subsequently as director of colonial information services in London from 1947 to 1950, before returning to the West Indies. He served as Governor of the Leeward Islands from 1950 to 1956 and as Governor of Jamaica from 1957 until 1962. When Jamaica received its independence in August 1962, Blackburne was appointed as the Governor-General; he served in that position for three months till 30 November 1962 when his Jamaican replacement, Clifford Campbell, took office.

Blackburne was also the patron of many organisations including the Commodore Royal Jamaica Yacht Club, the Amateur Swimming Association of Jamaica, the Jamaica Anti-Tuberculosis League, the Jamaica Automobile Association, the Jamaica Cricket Board of Control, the Jamaica Historical Society, and many others.

Personal life and death
On 18 May 1935, Blackburne married Bridgette Senhouse Constant, the daughter of James Mackay Wilson and Alice (née Goldie-Taubman). They had a son, Martin Andrew (born July 1944), and a daughter, Jean Alice (born February 1948). Blackburne was an Anglican and enjoyed tennis and sailing. He died on 4 November 1980 in Douglas, Isle of Man.

References

1907 births
1980 deaths
Colonial Administrative Service officers
Governors of Jamaica
Governors-General of Jamaica
Knights Grand Cross of the Order of St Michael and St George
Knights Grand Cross of the Order of the British Empire
People from Bordon
People from colonial Nigeria
British expatriates in Nigeria
British expatriates in the Gambia
British expatriates in Mandatory Palestine
British expatriates in Jamaica